This is a list of Richard Marx's collaborative work as a producer and songwriter for various artists.

1980s
1984
Kenny Rogers - What About Me
"What About Me" (With Kim Carnes & James Ingram) (Co-Writer)
"Somebody Took My Love" (Co-Writer)
"Crazy" (Co-Writer)
Fee Waybill - Read My Lips
"Who Loves You Baby" (Co-Writer)

1985
St. Elmo's Fire soundtrack
Vikki Moss - "If I Turn You Away" (Co-Writer/Co-Producer)

1986
David Foster - David Foster
"The Best of Me" (Co-Writer)

1987
Richard Carpenter - Time
"Calling Your Name Again" (Co-Writer)

1988
Vixen - Vixen
"Edge of a Broken Heart" (Co-Writer/Producer)

Tequila Sunrise soundtrack
Ann Wilson (of Heart) & Robin Zander (of Cheap Trick) - "Surrender to Me" (Co-Writer)

1989
Cliff Richard - Stronger
"The Best of Me" (Co-Writer)

Sing soundtrack
Kevin Cronin (of REO Speedwagon) - "(Everybody's Gotta) Face the Music (Co-Writer)

Steve Lukather - Lukather"Swear Your Love" (Co-Writer)

1990s
1990
John Farnham - Chain Reaction"Chains Around the Heart" (Co-Writer)

1991

Kiri Te Kanawa - Heart to Heart"The Best of Me" (Co-Writer)

Kiri Te Kanawa - The Kiri Selection"The Best of Me" (Co-Writer)

1992

Freddie Jackson - Time for Love"Live My Life Without You" (Co-Writer)

1993
John Farnham - Then Again..."The Reason Why" (Co-Writer)
"Treated This Way" (Co-Writer)
"Talent for Fame" (Co-Writer)
"So Long in Love" (Co-Writer)

The Hollies - 30th Anniversary Collection"Nothing Else but Love" (Co-Writer)

1994
Lara Fabian - Carpe Diem"Je Vivrai" (Co-Writer)
"Au Loin La-Bas" (Co-Writer)

Martin Nievera - Roads"Till the Day You Said Goodbye" (Co-Writer)

1995
Luther Vandross - This Is Christmas"Every Year, Every Christmas" (Co-Writer)

1996
Bruce Gaitsch - A Lyre in a Windstorm"Haunt Me Tonight" (Co-Writer)

Amy Sky - Cool Rain"Til Tomorrow" (Co-Writer/Producer)

The Tubes - Genius of America"How Can You Live with Yourself" (Co-Writer/Co-Producer)
"Big Brother's Still Watching" (Co-Writer/Co-Producer)

Roch Voisine - Kissing Rain"Chaque Jour De Ta Vie" (Duet with Richard Marx) (Writer/Producer)
"All I Know" (Co-Writer)

Fee Waybill - Don't Be Scared by These Hands"I Know You" (Co-Producer)
"Tall Dark and Harmless" (Co-Writer/Co-Producer)
"Shut Up and Love Me" (Co-Writer/Co-Producer)
"The Swing of Things" (Co-Writer/Co-Producer)
"Fools Cry" (Co-Writer/Co-Producer)
"Surprise Yourself" (Co-Producer)
"I've Seen This Movie Before" (Co-Writer/Co-Producer)
"Dying of Delight" (Co-Writer/Co-Producer)
"What's Wrong with That" (Co-Writer/Co-Producer)
"Somewhere Deep Inside" (Co-Writer/Co-Producer)

1997
Bruce Gaitsch - Asphasia"If I Could Only" - (Co-Writer)

1998
Sarah Brightman - Eden"The Last Words You Said" (Co-Writer/Producer)

Luther Vandross - I Know"Isn't There Someone" (Co-Writer)

1999
Shane Minor - Shane Minor"Easy to Believe" (Co-Writer)

Monica - The Boy Is MineRight Here Waiting (with 112) (Writer)

SheDaisy - The Whole SHeBANG"Still Holding Out for You" (Co-Writer)

Barbra Streisand - A Love Like Ours"If You Ever Leave Me" (Duet with Vince Gill) (Writer/Co-Producer)

2000s
2000
98 Degrees - Revelation"The Only Thing That Matters" (Co-Writer/Co-Producer)

Don Philip - Don Philip"Tenderly" (Writer/Producer) 

Natalie Cole - Greatest Hits, Vol. 1"Angel on My Shoulder" (Co-Writer/Producer)

Countdown - Who Let The Boys Out"This I Promise You" (Writer)

H.O.T. - 99 Live in Seoul"Right Here Waiting" (Writer)

N Sync - No Strings Attached"This I Promise You" (Writer/Producer)
"Yo Te Voy Amar" (Writer/Producer)

Kenny Rogers - There You Go Again"Crazy Me" (Co-Writer/Producer)
"I Do It for Your Love" (Co-Writer/Producer)

SheDaisy - Brand New Year"Brand New Year" (Co-Writer)

2001
Natalie Cole - Love Songs"Angel on My Shoulder" (Co-Writer/Producer)

Meredith Edwards - Reach"Ready to Fall" (Writer)
"This Is the Heartache" - (Co-Writer)
"Reach" - (Co-Writer)

Josh Groban - Josh Groban"To Where You Are" (Co-Writer/Producer)

Cliff Richard - Wanted"Right Here Waiting" (Writer)

The Tubes - Extended Versions"Loveline" (Co-Writer/Co-Producer)

Christina Undhjem - EP"Back in My Baby's Arms" (Writer)

2002
Michael Bolton - Only a Woman Like You"Slowly" (Co-Writer/Co-Producer)
"I Surrender" (Co-Writer/Co-Producer)
"Eternally" (Co-Writer/Co-Producer)

Chris Botti - December"Perfect Day" (Co-Writer/Co-Producer)
"Have Yourself a Merry Little Christmas" (Co-Producer)

Emerson Drive - Emerson Drive"Fall into Me" (Producer)
"Only God" (Co-Producer)
"How Lucky I Am" (Producer)

Marie Sisters - Marie Sisters"I Will Hold On (Co-Writer/Producer/Strings)
"If I Fall in Love Tonight" (Co-Writer/Producer)

Olivia Newton-John - (2)"Never Far Away" (Duet with Richard Marx) (Writer/Co-Producer)

Paulina Rubio - Border Girl"Border Girl" (Co-Writer)

SheDaisy - Knock on the Sky"All Over You" (Co-Writer)

Barbra Streisand - Duets"I Won't Be the One to Let Go" (Duet with Barry Manilow) (Co-Writer/Producer)
"If You Ever Leave Me" (Duet with Vince Gill (Writer/Co-Producer)

Bonnie Tyler - Heart Strings"Right Here Waiting" (Writer)

John Tesh - The Power of Love"This I Promise You" (Writer)

2003
Chicago - The Box"Good for Nothing" (Co-Writer)

Billy Ray Cyrus - The Other Side"Holding On to a Dream" (Co-Writer)

Vince Gill - Next Big Thing
"Someday" (Co-Writer/Producer)

Kenny Loggins - It's About Time"With This Ring" (Co-Writer)
"I Miss Us" (Co-Writer/Co-Producer)
"The One That Got Away" (Co-Writer)
"The Undeniable Groove" (Co-Writer)

Sister Hazel - Chasing Daylight"Life Got in the Way" (Co-Writer)

Kristy Starling - Kristy Starling"To Where You Are" (Co-Writer/Co-Producer)

Luther Vandross - Dance with My Father"Dance with My Father" (Co-Writer)Smooth Sax Tribute to Luther Vandross"Dance with My Father" (Co-Writer)

2004
Kellie Coffey - A Little More Me"Dance with My Father" (Co-Writer)

Emerson Drive - What If?"Last One Standing" (Co-Writer/Producer)
"Lemonade" (Producer)
"If You Were My Girl" (Co-Writer/Producer)
"What If (Producer)
"I'll Die Trying" (Producer)
"November" (Producer)
"Fishin' in the Dark" (Producer)
"You're Like Coming Home" (Producer)
"Take It from Me" (Producer)
"Waiting on Me" (Producer)
"Running Back to You" (Writer/Producer)
"Simple Miracles" (Co-Writer/Producer)
"Still Got Yesterday" (Producer)
"Rescued" (Producer)

William Hung - Miracle: Happy Summer from William Hung"Right Here Waiting" (Writer)

Kimberley Locke - One Love"Without You" (Co-Writer)

Donny Osmond - What I Meant to Say"Right Here Waiting" (Writer)

Kenny Rogers - 42 Ultimate Hits"Crazy" (Co-Writer)

Sissel - My Heart"Someone Like You" (Co-Writer/Producer)
"Beyond Imagination" (Co-Writer/Producer)

Sister Hazel - Lift"Surrender" (Co-Writer)
"World Inside My Head" (Co-Writer)

Keith Urban - Be Here"Better Life" (Co-Writer)Sounds of the SeasonsRichard Marx - "Santa Claus Is Back in Town" (Producer)Ultimate '80'sRichard Marx - "Right Here Waiting" (Writer/Co-Producer)

2005
N Sync - Greatest Hits"This I Promise You" (Writer/Producer)

Matt Tyler - Love Songs"Right Here Waiting" (Writer)

Ronan Tynan - Ronan
"Ready to Fly" (Writer)Disney's Happiest Celebration On Earth: 50 YearsLeAnn Rimes - "Remember When" (Writer/Producer)

Dave Koz - Golden Slumbers: A Father's Love]]"Dance with My Father" (Co-Writer)So Amazing: An All-Star Tribute to Luther VandrossCeline Dion - "Dance with My Father" (Co-Writer)

2006
Clay Aiken - A Thousand Different Ways"Right Here Waiting" (Writer)

Toni Braxton - Libra"Suddenly" (Writer/Producer)

Julio Iglesias - Romantic Classics"Right Here Waiting" (Writer)

Ronan Keating - Bring You Home"Just When I'd Give Up Dreaming" (Co-Writer)

Sister Hazel - Absolutely"Meet Me in the Memory" (Co-Writer/Producer)

Keith Urban - Love, Pain & the Whole Crazy Thing"Everybody" (Co-Writer)

Luther Vandross - The Ultimate Luther Vandross"Dance with My Father" (Co-Writer)

Country Dance Kings - A Tribute to Keith Urban"Better Life" (Co-Writer)

2007
Graham Colton - Here Right Now"Take You Back" (Co-Writer)

Kipper - This Is Different"When You Come Around" (Co-Writer)

Kenny Loggins - How About Now"I'll Remember Your Name" (Co-Writer/Co-Producer)

Cliff Richard - Love... The Album"The Best of Me" (Co-Writer)

Travis Tritt - The Storm"Mudcat Moan (Prelude)"/"You Never Take Me Dancing" (Writer)

Keith Urban - Greatest Hits: 18 Kids"Better Life" (Co-Writer)
"Everybody" (Co-Writer)Casey Kasem Presents the Long Distance DedicationsRichard Marx - "Right Here Waiting" (Writer/Co-Producer)New Music from an Old FriendRichard Marx - "Your Goodbye" (Writer/Co-Producer)
Richard Marx - "Hold on to the Nights" (Writer/Co-Producer)
Kenny Loggins - "I'll Remember Your Name" (Co-Writer/Co-Producer)

2008
George Canyon - What I Do"Just Like You" (Producer/Co-Writer)
"Pretty Drunk Out Tonight" (Producer)
"All or Nothing" (Producer/Co-Writer)
"Let It Out" (Producer)
"In Your Arms Again" (Producer/Co-Writer)
"Back to Life" (Producer/Co-Writer)
"Betty's Buns" (Producer)
"If I Was Jesus" (Producer)
"Fool in Me" (Producer/Co-Writer)
"What I Do" (Producer)
"Last Man" (Producer)
"Second Chance" (Co-Writer)
"I Believe in Angels" (Producer)

Hawk Nelson - Hawk Nelson Is My Friend"One Little Miracle" (Co-Writer)

Barry Manilow - The Greatest Songs of the Eighties"Right Here Waiting" - (Writer)

Alexander O'Neal - Alex Loves..."Right Here Waiting" (Writer)

Sister Hazel - Before the Amplifiers, Live Acoustic"World Inside My Head" (Co-Writer)Now That's What I Call Country!Keith Urban - "Everybody" (Co-Writer)Now That's What I Call Music 27Keith Urban - "Everybody" (Co-Writer)

2009
Daughtry - Leave This Town"On the Inside" (Co-Writer)

Default - Comes and Goes"All Over Me" (Co-Writer)

Jessie Farrell - Good, Bad & Pretty Things"Nobody Says No" (Co-Writer)

Katherine Jenkins - Believe"Fear of Falling" (Writer)

Red - Innocence & Instinct"Out from Under" (Co-Writer)

Kim Sozzi - Just One Day"Edge of a Broken Heart" (Co-Writer)

Vertical Horizon - Burning the Days"Save Me from Myself" (Co-Producer)
"Here" (Co-Producer)

2010s
2010
First Signal - First Signal"Part of Me" (Co-Writer)
"When November Falls" (Co-Writer)

Lifehouse - Smoke & Mirrors"Had Enough" (Co-Writer)
"Best of Me" (Co-Writer)

Philip Sayce - Innerevolution"Scars" (Co-Writer)
"Bitter Monday" (Co-Writer)

Ringo Starr - Y Not"Mystery of the Night" (Co-Writer)

Keith Urban - Get Closer"Long Hot Summer" (Co-Writer)

2011
Toni Braxton - Soul Pack: Toni Braxton"Suddenly" (Writer/Producer)

Joe McElderry - Classic"Dance with My Father" (Co-Writer)
"To Where You Are" - (Co-Writer)

Twiggy - Romantically Yours"Right Here Waiting" - (Co-Writer)

2012
Hinder - Welcome to the Freakshow"I Don't Wanna Believe" (Co-Writer)

Lionville - Lionville"The World Without Your Love" (Co-Writer)

Eli Tellor - Eli Tellor"Last Man Standing" (Co-Writer)
"Better Days" (Co-Writer)

2013
The Afters - Life Is Beautiful"Find Your Way" (Co-Writer)
"In My Eyes" (Co-Writer)

Blue Sky Riders - Finally Home"Little Victories" (Co-Writer)

Vertical Horizon - Echoes from the Underground"You Never Let Me Down" (Co-Writer/Co-Producer)
"Half-Light" (Co-Producer)

2014
Dave Koz - The 25th of DecemberRichard Marx - "Another Silent Night" (Co-Writer)

Jennifer Nettles - That Girl"Know You Wanna Know" (Co-Writer)
"Every Little Thing" (Co-Writer)

2015
Ringo Starr - Postcards from Paradise"Right Side of the Road" (Co-Writer)
"Not Looking Back" (Co-Writer)

2016
Jillian Jacqueline - non album single
"Overdue" - (Producer)

Rita Wilson - Rita Wilson"Say Yes" (Co-Writer)

2018
Vertical Horizon - The Lost Mile"I'm Not Running" (Co-Writer)

2019
Matt Nathanson - Postcards (from Chicago)"Hold On to the Nights" (Writer)

2020s

2020
Fee Waybill - Fee Waybill Rides Again"Faker" (Co-Writer/Producer)
"How Dare You" (Co-Writer/Producer)
"Don't Want to Pull the Trigger" (Co-Writer/Producer)
"Say Goodbye" (Co-Writer/Producer)
"Promise Land" (Co-Writer/Producer)
"Man of the World" (Co-Writer/Producer)
"Still You on the Inside" (Co-Writer/Producer)
"Woulda Coulda Shoulda" (Co-Writer/Producer)
"Meant to Be Alone" (Co-Writer/Producer)

2023
Bruce Gaitsch - How Fragile We Are''
Fools Cry (Co-Writer/Producer)
Haunt Me Tonight (Co-Writer)

References

Discography
Pop music discographies
Discographies of American artists